Rustica septemmeri is a moth of the family Erebidae first described by Michael Fibiger in 2008. It is known from Assam in north-eastern India.

The wingspan is about 13 mm. The forewing is long, narrow, pointed at apex and yellowish brown suffused with dark brown scales. The reniform stigma is yellow and weakly marked. The costal patch at the upper medial area is well marked and dark brown. The antemedial line is marked and dark brown but otherwise indistinct. The terminal line of the hindwing is weakly defined. There is a discal spot.

References

Micronoctuini
Moths described in 2008
Taxa named by Michael Fibiger